Matthew Rose (born July 10, 1981) is a Canadian former competition swimmer and national record-holder.  He swam for Canada at the 2004 Summer Olympics in Athens.

He attended Texas A&M University in College Station, Texas, where he swam for the Texas A&M Aggies swimming and diving team.  He was named the Big 12 Conference's Swimmer of the Year at the 2003 conference meet.

In November 2003, Rose became the first Canadian under 22 seconds in the short-course 50m freestyle, when he clocked a 21.95 at a meet at Texas A&M to set the Canadian Record.

An extended bio of Rose is available via Pacific Canadian Sport Centre's website Athlete Bios section.

See also
 List of Commonwealth Games medallists in swimming (men)

References

1981 births
Living people
Canadian male freestyle swimmers
Commonwealth Games bronze medallists for Canada
Olympic swimmers of Canada
Swimmers at the 2002 Commonwealth Games
Swimmers at the 2003 Pan American Games
Swimmers at the 2004 Summer Olympics
Texas A&M Aggies men's swimmers
Commonwealth Games medallists in swimming
Pan American Games bronze medalists for Canada
Pan American Games medalists in swimming
Medalists at the 2003 Pan American Games
Medallists at the 2002 Commonwealth Games